Happiness in Magazines is the fifth solo album by Graham Coxon. It was produced by Stephen Street who also produced Blur's first five albums and is Coxon's most commercially successful album to date. Happiness in Magazines reached 19 in the UK Albums chart and was certified Gold.

Reception

Happiness in Magazines was met with generally favourable reviews from music critics. At Metacritic, which assigns a normalized rating out of 100 to reviews from mainstream publications, the album received an average score of 77, based on 23 reviews.

Track listing
All songs written by Graham Coxon.
"Spectacular" – 2:48
"No Good Time" – 3:21
"Girl Done Gone" – 3:57
"Bittersweet Bundle of Misery" – 4:53
"All Over Me" – 4:16
"Freakin' Out" – 3:42
"People of the Earth" – 3:04
"Hopeless Friend" – 3:22
"Are You Ready?" – 4:42
"Bottom Bunk" – 3:16
"Don't Be a Stranger" – 3:29
"Ribbons and Leaves" – 4:11

Bonus tracks
"Life It Sucks" (Japan)
"Right to Pop!" (United States)

Personnel 
Graham Coxon - lead vocals, all instruments except:
Louis Vause - organ and piano on tracks 4, 5, 8, 9 and 10
Angie Pollock - backing vocals on tracks 4 and 11; marimba on track 11
The Duke Street Quartet - strings on tracks 5, 8 and 9
John Metcalf - string arrangement on tracks 5, 8 and 9; horn arrangement on track 12
Marcus Bates - French horn on track 12
Pip Eastop - French horn on track 12
Phillip Woods - French horn on track 12
Technical
Stephen Street - producer
Cenzo Townshend - engineer
Alex Hutchinson - sleeve design

Singles
Four singles have been released from Happiness in Magazines.
"Freakin' Out", released 8 March 2004 - charted at #37
"Bittersweet Bundle of Misery", released 3 May 2004 - charted at #22
"Spectacular", released 26 July 2004 - charted at #32
"Freakin' Out" / "All Over Me", released 25 October 2004 - charted at #19

Release details
The album has been released in various countries.

References

2004 albums
Graham Coxon albums
Parlophone albums
Albums produced by Stephen Street